Rampart Lakes area a set of contiguous freshwater reservoir lakes located on the south slope of Alta Mountain, in Kittitas County, Washington. Self-issued Alpine Lake Wilderness permit required for transit within the Klonaqua Lakes area. The lake is a popular area for hiking, swimming, and fishing cutthroat trout.

Climate
Rampart Lakes are in a hemiboreal climate. The average temperature is 4 °C. The warmest month is August, with an average temperature of 17 °C, and the coldest month is January, at an average of −8 °C. Temperatures and precipitation are similar to surrounding lakes of the Alpine Lakes Wilderness. The wettest month is January, with 396 millimeters of rain, and the least in July, with 38 millimeters of rain.

Access
Rampart Lakes are located approximately one mile west of Rachel Lake and access is obtained as an extension to Rachel Lake Trail #1313. The trail follows Box Canyon Creek from the trailhead which begins at Forest Road 4930 at the Western shores of Little Kachess Lake, approximately 20 miles east of The Summit at Snoqualmie off Interstate 90.

See also 
 List of lakes of the Alpine Lakes Wilderness

References 

Lakes of Kittitas County, Washington
Lakes of the Alpine Lakes Wilderness
Okanogan National Forest